Niccolò Giolfino (c. 1476 – 1555) was an Italian painter of the Renaissance period, active mainly in Verona.

Biography
He was a pupil of Liberale da Verona. One source attributes the influence of Andrea Mantegna. He painted mainly sacred subjects for local churches. He painted two canvases for a chapel in San Bernardino. He painted frescoes for the church of Santa Maria in Organo and in a chapel in San Bernardino. His brother, Paolo Giolfino, painted in a similar style. Another of his pupils was Paolo Farinato.

External links

References

Berenson, B. North Italian Painters of the Renaissance. (GP. Putnam's Sons publisher, 1907) p. 235.

1470s births
1555 deaths
15th-century Italian painters
Italian male painters
16th-century Italian painters
Painters from Verona
Italian Renaissance painters